A turf war is a fight over territory or resources, or may refer to:

Music
 Turf Wars, a 2007 album by the Canadian band Daggermouth
 "Turf War", a song on the 2001 album Filmtracks 2000 by American composer Bill

Television
 Turf War, a 2010 American reality television series
 "Turf War" (The Office), a 2012 episode of the American comedy television series The Office
 "Turf War", an episode of the 2012 American television series The Mob Doctor
 "Turf War", an episode of the 2012 American television series NYC 22
 "Turf War", a 2010 episode of the American television series Swords
 "My Turf War", a 2007 episode of the American television series Scrubs

Other
 "Turf War" (Banksy), a 2003 exhibition by street artist Banksy
 The Legend of Korra: Turf Wars, a three-part graphic novel series
 Turf War (horse), tied winner of the 2007 Delta Jackpot Stakes
 Turf War, a mode of play in the 2000 video game Smuggler's Run
 Turf War, a gameplay mode in Nintendo's video game series Splatoon

See also
 Gang war (disambiguation)
 Turf (disambiguation)